Bloemenwerf is the name of the residence house of Belgian painter, architect and interior designer Henry van de Velde, built in 1895. It is located in Uccle, Brussels, Belgium. Velde designed the house and its interior as well as the furnishings.  It was inspired in part by William Morris' Red House.

Van de Velde gave everything in the house, from the door furnishings to the wallpaper, the same patterns of embellishments and flowing linear shapes.

References

Further reading

External links 
 Unesco website

Houses in Belgium
Henry van de Velde buildings
Art Nouveau architecture in Brussels
Art Nouveau houses
Houses completed in 1895